The Last Full Measure is the third studio album by Swedish power metal band Civil War, released in 2016.

Track list

Personnel 
Nils Patrik Johansson – vocals
Rikard Sundén – guitar
Petrus Granar – guitar
Daniel Mÿhr – keyboards
Daniel Mullback – drums

Charts

References

External links 
Reviews
 Metal Hammer
 Metal.de
 Antichrist Magazine
 Rocknytt

2016 albums
Civil War (band) albums